Christopher Pikula is an American Magic: The Gathering player. Pikula started playing on the Pro Tour at the very first Pro Tour in New York, 1996. He attended the other two Pro Tour events that season too, failing to attend only the World Championship. Success came at the beginning of the second season, when Pikula reached consecutive Pro Tour Top 8s. In the 1997–98 season he had another Top 8 appearance, this time at the World Championship. Afterwards he reached the Top 8s of two Grand Prix events, but gradually disappeared from the pro scene.

Pikula is best known for creating the Magic card , his reward for winning the 2000 Magic Invitational. In the 2005 season, he had a small comeback where he reached the Top 8 of another two Grand Prix events. Pikula also made Top 8 in 2017 at GP Orlando.

Achievements

References

Year of birth missing (living people)
Living people
American Magic: The Gathering players
People from New York City
Place of birth missing (living people)